B. andrewsi  may refer to:
 Bufo andrewsi, a toad species found in China
 Bunomys andrewsi, a rodent species

See also
 Andrewsi (disambiguation)